In economics, a luxury good (or upmarket good) is a good for which demand increases more than what is proportional as income rises, so that expenditures on the good become a greater proportion of overall spending. Luxury goods are in contrast to necessity goods, where demand increases proportionally less than income. Luxury goods is often used synonymously with superior goods.

Definition and etymology
The word "luxury" derives from the Latin verb luxor meaning to overextend or strain.  From this the noun luxuria and verb luxurio developed, "indicating immoderate growth, swelling, ... in persons and animals, willful or unruly behavior, disregard for moral restraints, and licensciousness", and the term has had negative connotations for most of its long history. One definition in the OED is a "thing desirable but not necessary". A luxury good can be identified by comparing the demand for the good at one point in time against the demand for the good at a different point in time, at a different income level. When personal income increases, demand for luxury goods increases even more than income does. 

Conversely, when personal income decreases, demand for luxury goods drops even more than income does. For example, if income rises 1%, and the demand for a product rises 2%, then the product is a luxury good. This contrasts with necessity goods, or basic goods, for which demand stays the same or decreases only slightly as income decreases.

Scope of the term
With increasing accessibility to luxury goods, new product categories have been created within the luxury market, called "accessible luxury" or "mass luxury". These are meant specifically for the middle class, sometimes called the "aspiring class" in this context. Because luxury has now diffused into the masses, defining the word has become more difficult.

Whereas luxury often refers to a certain types of products, luxury is not restricted to physical goods; services can also be luxury. Likewise, from the consumer perspective, luxury is an experience that has been defined as "hedonic escapism."

Confusion with normal goods
"Superior goods" is the gradable antonym of "inferior goods". If the quantity of an item demanded increases with income, but not by enough to increase the share of the budget spent on it, then it is only a normal good and is not a superior good. Consumption of all normal goods increases as income increases. For example, if income increases by 50%, then consumption will increase (maybe by only 1%, maybe by 40%, maybe by 70%). A superior good is a normal good for which the proportional consumption increase exceeds the proportional income increase. So, if income increases by 50% then consumption of a superior good will increase by more than 50% (maybe 51%, maybe 70%).

In economics terminology, all goods with an income elasticity of demand greater than zero are "normal", but only the subset having income elasticity of demand > 1 are "superior".

Some articles in the microeconomics discipline use the term superior-good as an alternative to an inferior good, thus making "superior goods" and "normal goods" synonymous. Where this is done, a product making up an increasing share of spending under income increases is often called an ultra-superior good.

Art history

Though often verging on the meaningless in modern marketing, "luxury" remains a legitimate and current technical term in art history for objects that are especially highly decorated to very high standards and use expensive materials. The term is especially used for medieval manuscripts to distinguish between practical working books for normal use, and fully illuminated manuscripts, that were often bound in treasure bindings with metalwork and jewels. These are often much larger, with less text on each page and many illustrations, and if liturgical texts were originally usually kept on the altar or sacristy rather any library that the church or monastery who owned them may have had. Secular luxury manuscripts were commissioned by the very wealthy and differed in the same ways from cheaper books.

"Luxury" and luxury arts, may be used for other applied arts where both utilitarian and luxury versions of the same types of objects were made. This might cover metalwork, ceramics, glass, arms and armor, and a wide range of objects.  It is much less used for objects from the fine arts, with no function beyond being an artwork: paintings, drawings, and sculpture, even though the disparity in cost between an expensive and cheap work may have been as large.

Market

Characteristics
Luxury goods have high income elasticity of demand: as people become wealthier, they will buy proportionately more luxury goods. This also means, however, that should there be a decline in income, its demand will drop more than proportionately. The income elasticity of demand is not constant with respect to income and may change signs at different levels of income. That is to say, a luxury good may become a necessity good or even an inferior good at different income levels.

Some luxury products have been claimed to be examples of Veblen goods, with a positive price elasticity of demand: for example, making a perfume more expensive can increase its perceived value as a luxury good to such an extent that sales can go up, rather than down. However, Veblen goods are not synonymous with luxury goods.

Although the technical term luxury good is independent of the goods' quality, they are generally considered to be goods at the highest end of the market in terms of quality and price. Many markets have a luxury segment including, for example, luxury versions of automobiles, yachts, wine, bottled water, coffee, tea, foods, watches, clothes, jewelry, and high fidelity sound equipment. Luxuries may be services. The hiring of full-time or live-in domestic servants is a luxury reflecting disparities of income. Some financial services, especially in some brokerage houses, can be considered luxury services by default because persons in lower-income brackets generally do not use them.

Luxury goods often have special luxury packaging to differentiate the products from mainstream competitors.

Trends
Originally, luxury goods were available only to the very wealthy and "aristocratic world of old money" that offered them a history of tradition, superior quality, along with a pampered buying experience. Luxury goods have been transformed by a shift from custom-made (bespoke) works with exclusive distribution practices by specialized, quality-minded family-run and small businesses to a mass production of specialty branded goods by profit-focused large corporations and marketers. The trend in modern luxury is simply a product or service that is marketed, packaged, and sold by global corporations that are focused "on growth, visibility, brand awareness, advertising, and, above all, profits." Increasingly, luxury logos are now available to all consumers at a premium price across the world including online.

Global consumer companies, such as Procter & Gamble, are also attracted to the industry, due to the difficulty of making a profit in the mass consumer goods market. The customer base for various luxury goods continue to be more culturally diversified, and this presents more unseen challenges and new opportunities to companies in this industry.

The three dominant trends in the global luxury goods market include:
Globalization: Consumers in some countries are becoming wealthier, thus new markets are opening for luxury marketers.
Consolidation: Consolidation involves the growth of big companies and ownership of brands across many segments of luxury products. Examples include Kering, LVMH, and Richemont, which dominate the market in areas ranging from luxury drinks to fashion and cosmetics.
Diversification

Size
The luxury goods market has been on an upward climb for many years. Apart from the setback caused by the 1997 Asian Financial Crisis, the industry has performed well, particularly in 2000. In that year, the world luxury goods market was worth close to $170 billion and grew 7.9 percent. The United States has been the largest regional market for luxury goods and is estimated to continue to be the leading personal luxury goods market in 2013, with a value of 62.5 billion euros. The largest sector in this category was luxury drinks, including premium whisky, champagne, and cognac. This sector was the only one that suffered a decline in value (-0.9 percent). The watches and jewelry section showed the strongest performance, growing in value by 23.3 percent, while the clothing and accessories section grew 11.6 percent between 1996 and 2000, to $32.8 billion. The largest ten markets for luxury goods account for 83 percent of overall sales, and include Japan, China, United States, Russia, Germany, Italy, France, United Kingdom, Brazil, Spain, and Switzerland.

In 2012, China surpassed Japan as the world's largest luxury market. China's luxury consumption accounts for over 25% of the global market. According to the Global Wealth and Lifestyle Report 2020, Hong Kong, Shanghai, Tokyo and Singapore were four of the five most expensive cities for luxury goods in Asia. In 2014, the luxury sector was expected to grow over the following 10 years because of 440 million consumers spending a total of 880 billion euros, or $1.2 trillion.

Advertising
The advertising expenditure for the average luxury brand is 5-15% of sales revenue, or about 25% with the inclusion of other communications such as public relations, events, and sponsorships.

A rather small group in comparison, the wealthy tend to be extremely influential. Once a brand gets an "endorsement" from members of this group, then the brand can be defined as a true "luxury" brand. An example of different product lines in the same brand is found in the automotive industry, with "entry-level" cars marketed to younger, less wealthy consumers, and higher-cost models for older and more wealthy consumers.

Economics
In economics, superior goods or luxury goods make up a larger proportion of consumption as income rises, and therefore are a type of normal goods in consumer theory. Such a good must possess two economic characteristics: it must be scarce, and, along with that, it must have a high price. The scarcity of the good can be natural or artificial; however, the general population (i.e., consumers) must recognize the good as distinguishably better. Possession of such a good usually signifies "superiority" in resources, and usually is accompanied by prestige.

A Veblen good is a superior good with a prestige value so high that a price decline might lower demand.

The income elasticity of a superior good is above one by definition, because it raises the expenditure share as income rises. A superior good also may be a luxury good that is not purchased at all below a certain level of income. Examples would include smoked salmon, caviar, and most other delicacies. On the other hand, superior goods may have a wide quality distribution, such as wine and holidays. However, though the number of such goods consumed may stay constant even with rising wealth, the level of spending will go up, to secure a better experience.

A higher income inequality leads to higher consumption of luxury goods because of status anxiety.

Socioeconomic significance

Several manufactured products attain the status of "luxury goods" due to their design, quality, durability, or performance which are superior to the comparable substitutes.

There are also goods that are perceived as luxurious by the public, simply because they play the role of status symbols, as such goods tend to signify the purchasing power of those who acquire them. These items, while not necessarily being better (in quality, performance, or appearance) than their less expensive substitutes, are purchased with the main purpose of displaying wealth or income of their owners. These kinds of goods are the objects of a socio-economic phenomenon called conspicuous consumption and commonly include luxury vehicles, watches, jewelry, designer clothing, yachts, private jets, corporate helicopters as well as large residences, urban mansions, and country houses.

Luxury brands
The idea of a luxury brand is not necessarily a product or a price point, but a mindset where core values that are expressed by a brand are directly connected to the producer's dedication and alignment to perceptions of quality with its customers' values and aspirations. Thus, it is these target customers, not the product, that make a luxury brand. Brands that are considered luxury connect with their customers by communicating that they are at the top of their class or considered the best in their field. Furthermore, these brands must deliver - in some meaningful way - measurably better performance. What consumers perceive as luxurious brands and products change over the years, but there appear to be three main drivers: (1) a high price, especially when compared to other brands within its segment; (2) limited supply, in that a brand may not need to be expensive, but it arguably should not be easily obtainable and contributing to the customers' feeling that they have something special; and (3) endorsement by celebrities, which can make a brand or particular products more appealing for consumers and thus more "luxurious" in their minds. Two additional elements of luxury brands include special packaging and personalization. These differentiating elements distance the brands from the mass market and thus provide them with a unique feeling and user experience as well as a special and memorable "luxury feel" for customers. However, the concept of a luxury brand is now so popular that it is used in almost every retail, manufacturing, and service sector. Moreover, new marketing concepts such as "mass-luxury" or "hyper luxury" further blur the definition of what is a luxury product, a luxury brand, or a luxury company.

Examples include LVMH, the largest luxury goods producer in the world with over fifty brands (including Louis Vuitton) and sales of €42.6 billion in 2017, Kering, which made €15.9 billion in revenue for a net income of €2.3 billion in 2019, and Richemont.

Luxury department stores

Since the development of mass-market "luxury" brands in the 1800s. Extraordinary places will be the factor of development that can be achieved by enabling the conversion of items from the mass-market to the luxury market.

Many innovative technologies are being added to mass-market products and then transformed into luxury items to be placed in department stores.

Department stores dedicated to selling all major luxury brands have opened up in most major cities around the world. Le Bon Marché in Paris, France is credited as one of the first of its kind.

In the United States, the development of luxury-oriented department stores not only changed the retail industry, but also ushered the idea of freedom through consumerism, and a new opportunity for middle- and upper-class women.

Luxury shopping districts

Fashion brands within the luxury goods market tend to be concentrated in exclusive or affluent districts of cities around the world. These include:

 Amsterdam's P.C. Hooftstraat
 Athens' Voukourestiou Street and Kolonaki district
 Bangalore's UB City
 Barcelona's Passeig de Gràcia
 Beijing’s Yabaolu
 Berlin's Kurfürstendamm
 Bogotá's Zona T
 Boston's Newbury Street
 Brussels' Louizalaan/Avenue Louise
 Buenos Aires' Recoleta
 Cartagena's Bocagrande
 Chicago's Oak Street
 Düsseldorf's Königsallee
 Florence's Via de' Tornabuoni
 Frankfurt's Freßgass
 Hamburg's Neuer Wall
 Hong Kong's Central, Tsim Sha Tsui
 Istanbul's Abdi İpekçi Street and İstinye Park
 Jakarta's Menteng and Kebayoran Baru
 Johannesburg's Sandton (Nelson Mandela Square)
 Kuala Lumpur's Bukit Bintang and KLCC
 Las Vegas's Strip
 Leeds' Victoria Quarter
 Lisbon's Avenida da Liberdade
 London's Bond Street and Sloane Street
 Los Angeles' Beverly Hills (Rodeo Drive)
 Madrid's Calle de Serrano
 Manila's Ayala Avenue
 Medellín's El Poblado
 Melbourne's Collins Street
 Montreal's Rue Sainte-Catherine
 Mexico City's Avenida Presidente Masaryk
 Milan's Via Monte Napoleone
 Moscow's Tverskaya Street and Stoleshnikov Lane
 Munich's Maximilianstraße
 New York's Madison Avenue, Fifth Avenue and SoHo
 Paris' Champs-Élysées, Avenue Montaigne and Rue du Faubourg Saint-Honoré
 Palm Beach's Worth Avenue
 Panama City's Multiplaza Pacific
 Philadelphia's Walnut Street
 Prague's Pařížská
 Rome's Via Condotti
 San Francisco's Union Square
 San Jose’s Santana Row
 Santiago's Alonso de Cordoba
 São Paulo's Rua Oscar Freire
 Seoul's Cheongdam-dong
 Shanghai's Middle Huaihai Road
 Singapore's Orchard Road
 Stockholm's Biblioteksgatan
 Sydney's Castlereagh Street
 Taipei's Xinyi District
 Tel Aviv's Kikar Hamedina
 Tokyo's Ginza and Aoyama
 Toronto's Mink Mile 
 Vancouver's Alberni Street
 Warsaw's Nowy Świat Street
 Zürich's Bahnhofstrasse

See also

 Behavioral economics
 Collecting
 Commodity fetishism
 Conspicuous consumption
 Designer label
 Inferior good
 Mid-luxury
 Necessity good
 Positional good
 Sumptuary law
 Veblen goods
 Wealth effect
 Money
 List of most expensive and valuable assets
 Lists of most expensive items by category

References

Lapatin, Kenneth D. S., Luxus, The Sumptuous Arts of Greece and Rome, 2015, J. Paul Getty Museum, ISBN 9781606064221, google books

Further reading
 
 

Goods (economics)
Brand management
 
Retailing by products and services sold

de:Luxus
sl:Luksuz